Udanoceratops (meaning "Udan's horned face") is a genus of large leptoceratopsid dinosaur that lived during the Late Cretaceous period of Mongolia, in what is now the Djadokhta Formation.

Discovery

Udanoceratops was first named and described by Russian paleontologist Sergei Kurzanov in 1992 and the type species is Udanoceratops tschizhovi. The holotype (PIN 3907/11) was collected during the 1980s at the Udan Sayr (also spelled Udyn Sayr or Üüden Sair) locality of the Djadokhta Formation in Ömnögovi Province, dating to the Campanian stage of the Late Cretaceous period. The generic name is derived from the name of the locality in which the holotype was found (Udan Sayr) and Greek ceras/κέρας meaning "horn" and -ops/ωψ meaning "face". Udanoceratops is best known from the holotype specimen, which represents a large individual comprising a large, relatively well-preserved and almost complete skull, and sparse body remains including vertebrae.

In 1993 a large skull ("nearly 1 m long") assigned to Udanoceratops was reported from the nearby Bayan Mandahu Formation by paleontologist Tomasz Jerzykiewicz. However, Polish paleontologist Łukasz Czepiński in 2020 pointed out that there are no referable specimens to Udanoceratops from the Bayan Mandahu collections, and it is most likely that these remains were confused with the concurring (and relatively large) Protoceratops hellenikorhinus.

In 2004 Viktor S. Tereschhenko referred a juvenile specimen (PIN 4046/11) to Udanoceratops aff. tschizhovi, from the Baga Tariach locality in Dornogovi Province, which Tereschhenko attributed to the Djadokhta Formation. Geological analyses carried out across fossiliferous localities of the Gobi Desert published by Mahito Watabe and team in 2010, indicates that this locality instead correlates best with the Maastrichtian-stage Barun Goyot Formation. The assignment of this specimen, however, has varied since then from "Udanoceratops" sp., to ?Udanoceratops sp.

Description

It is the largest leptoceratopsid known so far. The skull had a short frill and no horns over the eyes or nose. The lower jaw was distinctively robust.

Classification

Udanoceratops belonged to the Ceratopsia (the name is derived Greek meaning 'horned face'), a group of herbivorous dinosaurs with parrot-like beaks which thrived in North America and Asia during the Cretaceous Period. It is placed within the Leptoceratopsidae, as the only Asian representative at the time, along with the North American Leptoceratops, Montanoceratops and Prenoceratops.

Paleobiology

Udanoceratops, like all ceratopsians, was a herbivore. The short, deep jaws would have given the animal a powerful bite. The toothless beak would have served to grasp and crop stems or leaves, and as in other leptoceratopsids, the teeth would have met with an action that combined shearing and crushing. The feeding adaptations seen in leptoceratopsids suggest a diet of relatively tough food items, however little is known about the plants that grew in the Gobi Desert during the Cretaceous.

See also
 Timeline of ceratopsian research

References

External links

 
 

Leptoceratopsids
Ornithischian genera
Campanian genera
Late Cretaceous dinosaurs of Asia
Djadochta fauna
Fossil taxa described in 1992
Taxa named by Sergei Kurzanov